The 2003 IIHF World Championship Final was an ice hockey match that took place on May 11, 2003 in Helsinki, Finland, to determine the winner of the 2003 IIHF World Championship. Canada defeated Sweden to win its 22nd championship.

Details

See also 
 2003 IIHF World Championship
 Canada men's national ice hockey team
 Sweden men's national ice hockey team

References 
Official IIHF game report
Game report on hockeyarchives.info

IIHF World Championship Finals
Final
2003
W
w
Sweden men's national ice hockey team games
International sports competitions in Helsinki
2000s in Helsinki